David Porter (February 1, 1780 – March 3, 1843) was an officer in the United States Navy in the rank of captain and the honorary title of commodore. Porter commanded a number of U.S. naval ships. He saw service in the First Barbary War, the War of 1812 and in the West Indies. On July 2, 1812, Porter hoisted the banner "Free trade and sailors' rights" as captain of USS Essex. The phrase resonated with many Americans. Porter was later court martialed; he resigned and then joined and became commander-in-chief of the Mexican Navy. Porter County, Indiana was named after him.

Early life and education

Personal life
Porter married Evalina Anderson, and they had ten children who survived, including six sons. One of these, David Dixon Porter, became an admiral in the U.S. Navy.

Porter purchased the grand home built by the judge and politician David Lloyd in Chester, Pennsylvania. He made many additions, and the home became known as the Porter House. It was destroyed by explosion in 1882.

Porter's father, David Porter Sr., met and befriended another naval veteran of the Revolution, George Farragut, from the Balearic island of Minorca. In late spring 1808, David Sr. suffered sunstroke, and Farragut took him into his home, where his wife Elizabeth cared for him. Already weakened by tuberculosis, he died on June 22, 1808. Elizabeth Farragut died of yellow fever the same day. Motherless, the Farragut children were to be placed with friends and relatives.

While visiting Farragut and his family a short time later to express thanks for their care of his father and sympathy for their loss, Commodore Porter offered to take eight-year-old James Glasgow Farragut into his own household. Young James readily agreed. In 1809 he moved with Porter to Washington, where he met Secretary of the Navy Paul Hamilton and expressed his wish for a midshipman's appointment. Hamilton promised that the appointment would be made as soon as he reached the age of ten; as it happened, the commission came through on December 17, 1810, six months before the boy reached his tenth birthday. When James went to sea soon after with his adoptive father, he changed his name from James to David, and it is as David Glasgow Farragut that he is remembered.

Career
Porter served in the Quasi war with France. He was appointed a midshipman on 16 April 1798. He was assigned to  under the command of John Rodgers. He was promoted to lieutenant on 8 October 1799. As lieutenant he served as second in command of the schooner  during the action of 1 January 1800, in which he got shot in his arm.  He was promoted to master commandant on 22 April 1806 and was in charge of the naval forces at New Orleans from 1808 to 1810.

War of 1812
He sailed out of New York harbor with the banner, "Free trade and sailors' rights" flying from the foretopgallant mast. Captain Porter achieved fame by capturing the first British warship of the conflict,  on August 13, 1812, as well as several merchantmen.

In February 1813 he sailed Essex around Cape Horn and cruised the Pacific warring on British whalers. Porter's first action in the Pacific was the capture of the Peruvian vessel Nereyda, and the releases of the captured American whalers on board. Over the next year, Porter would capture 12 whaleships and 360 prisoners. In June 1813, Porter released his prisoners, on the condition that they not fight against the United States until they were formally exchanged for American prisoners of war. Porter's usual tactic was to raise British colors to allay the British captain's suspicions, then once invited on board, he would reveal his true allegiance and purpose.

Porter and his fleet spent October–December 1813 resting and regrouping in the Marquesas Islands, which he claimed in the name of the United States and renamed them the Madison Islands, in honor of then-President James Madison.

On March 28, 1814, Porter was forced to surrender to Captain James Hillyar off Valparaíso after an engagement which became known as the Battle of Valparaiso with the British frigate  and the sloop-of-war , when his ship became too disabled to offer any resistance.

West Indies
 
From 1815 to 1822, he was a member of the Board of Navy Commissioners but gave up this post to command the expedition for suppressing piracy in the West Indies (1823–25). While in the West Indies suppressing piracy, Porter invaded the town of Fajardo, Puerto Rico (a Spanish colony) to avenge the jailing of an officer from his fleet. The U.S. government did not sanction Porter's act, and he was court-martialed upon his return to the U.S. Porter resigned from the Navy on August 18, 1826, and, shortly after, entered the Mexican Navy as its commander-in-chief. He held this position from 1826 to 1829.

Later life and death

He left the Mexican service in 1829 and was appointed United States Minister to the Barbary States.

He was appointed as Chargé d'Affaires to the Ottoman Empire by President Andrew Jackson in 1831 and was promoted to Minister Resident in 1840.

He died on March 3, 1843, in Constantinople, Ottoman Empire while serving as United States Minister Resident to the Ottoman Empire. He was buried in the cemetery of the Philadelphia Naval Asylum, and then in 1845 reburied in the Woodlands Cemetery in Philadelphia, Pennsylvania.

Dates of rank
Midshipman - April 16, 1798
Lieutenant - October 8, 1799
Master Commandant - April 22, 1806
Captain - July 2, 1812
Resigned - August 18, 1826

In popular culture
Porter is played by Jeff Chandler in the film Yankee Buccaneer (1952).

Legacy
Several U.S. Navy ships have been named  after him.
The town of Porter and Porter County in Northwest Indiana are named after David Porter. In 1836 the county seat of Porter County, Indiana was originally named Portersville, also named for David Porter.  It was changed to Valparaiso in 1837, named for Porter's participation in the naval action near Valparaíso, Chile during the War of 1812.

References

Further reading
 Porter, David D. Memoir of Commodore David Porter of the United States Navy (Albany, N.Y.: J. Munsell, 1875)
 Turnbull, Archibald Douglas. Commodore David Porter, 1780- 1843 (New York and London: Century, 1929)
 Daughan, George C. The Shining Sea: David Porter and the Epic Voyage of the U.S.S. Essex during the War of 1812 (Basic Books; 2013)

External links
Images and biography from Naval History & Heritage Command, Washington, D.C.
Journal of a Cruise Made to the Pacific Ocean by David Porter, 1822
A Voyage in the South Seas, in the Years 1812, 1813, and 1814 by David Porter, 1823
Chiefs of Mission for Turkey at the Office of the Historian

1780 births
1843 deaths
People involved in anti-piracy efforts
United States Navy personnel of the War of 1812
Porter family
People from Boston
American military personnel of the Quasi-War
American military personnel of the First Barbary War
Ambassadors of the United States to the Ottoman Empire
Mexican Navy personnel
Burials at The Woodlands Cemetery
United States Navy commodores
19th-century American diplomats
War of 1812 prisoners of war held by the United Kingdom